Camila Grey (born Camila Cristinna Gutierrez; January 6, 1983) is an American musician currently performing in the duo Uh Huh Her and also the supergroup Summer Moon composed of Nikolai Fraiture (The Strokes), Stephen Perkins (Jane's Addiction), and Noah Harmon (Airborne Toxic Event). Grey was formerly the bassist and keyboardist for the band Mellowdrone. She has also worked with such artists as Dr. Dre, Busta Rhymes, Big Black Delta, Tricky, Linda Perry, Kanye West, Melissa Auf der Maur, Hans Zimmer, Kelly Osbourne, and Adam Lambert.

Early life 
Camila Grey was born Camila Cristinna Gutierrez in Dallas, Texas, but grew up in Austin.

Grey began playing piano as a child and attended the Suzuki music school. She later attended Berklee College of Music where she met Mellowdrone bandmate Jonathan Bates, who was also enrolled. After graduating, Grey moved to L.A. and began working as a session singer vocalist. Her work includes the soundtracks to Something's Gotta Give, Dirty Dancing: Havana Nights, Catwoman, and the television show Nip/Tuck.

Early career 
Camila Grey was a member of lo-fi band Mellowdrone from 2005–2006, and later Big Black Delta from 2010-2013, led by the same front man Jonathan Bates.

2007–2014, Uh Huh Her 
Grey is a native of Austin, Texas. After meeting at a party, Grey began working with Leisha Hailey (actress on The L Word and former member of 1990s group The Murmurs) on songs which would be released in 2007 on the EP I See Red. The album was recorded at Grey's L.A. home, and the vocals were reportedly recorded inside of Grey's bathroom. As Uh Huh Her, Grey and Hailey released an album in 2008, titled Common Reaction. Shortly after Common Reactions release, Uh Huh Her was dropped from Nettwerk, prompting Grey and Hailey to start releasing music independently on their own label Plaid, even stating that they still owed Nettwerk money.

From 2009 to 2011, Grey played keyboards for Adam Lambert's live band. Consequently, she was also on Glam Nation Live, released in early 2011, and Acoustic Live!, released in late 2010.

In the spring of 2011, Uh Huh Her released a second EP titled Black and Blue and finished a tour promoting it in May 2011. They released their sophomore record titled Nocturnes in late summer/early fall of 2011. They then released EP3, a collection of their old songs re-imagined acoustically. They released their third studio album titled Future Souls on March 25, 2014, via their imprint Plaid Records. On December 15, 2016, Uh Huh Her announced on their official Facebook page that they were taking a hiatus, with Grey joining another indie band called Summer Moon.

Personal life 
Grey is openly pansexual. She was previously linked to Clea Duvall. From 2011 to 2016, Grey was in a relationship with her Uh Huh Her bandmate Leisha Hailey. Their relationship first became public when the two were ejected from a Southwest Airlines flight for arguing with a flight attendant who, after seeing them exchange a kiss, stated it was a "family airline" and asked them to stop.

References

External links 
 The official UHH website and store
 The unofficial UHH fan site – Latest news, photos, videos, downloads
Uh Huh Her fan site on Twitter – Get all the latest updates on the site instantly!
club de fans de españa hazte socio

American bass guitarists
Berklee College of Music alumni
Women bass guitarists
LGBT people from Texas
Musicians from Austin, Texas
Living people
Guitarists from Texas
American women guitarists
1983 births
20th-century American LGBT people
21st-century LGBT people
Pansexual musicians
21st-century American women